Kothangudi is a village in the Papanasam taluk of Thanjavur district, Tamil Nadu, India.

Demographics 

As per the 2001 census, Kothangudi had a total population of 791 with 394 males and 397 females. The sex ratio was 1008. The literacy rate was 56.71.

References 

 

Villages in Thanjavur district